Valdeci Moreira da Silva (born 26 March 1995), simply known as Valdeci, is a Brazilian footballer who plays for Ferroviário. Mainly an attacking midfielder, he can also play as a right winger.

Career statistics

Honours
Alto Santo
Campeonato Cearense Série C: 2015

Ferroviário
Copa Fares Lopes: 2018
Campeonato Brasileiro Série D: 2018

References

External links

1995 births
Living people
Sportspeople from Ceará
Sportspeople from Fortaleza
Brazilian footballers
Association football midfielders
Campeonato Brasileiro Série B players
Campeonato Brasileiro Série C players
Campeonato Brasileiro Série D players
Paraguayan Primera División players
Ferroviário Atlético Clube (CE) players
Associação Portuguesa de Desportos players
Horizonte Futebol Clube players
Resende Futebol Clube players
Sportivo Luqueño players
Coritiba Foot Ball Club players
Brazilian expatriate footballers
Brazilian expatriate sportspeople in Paraguay
Expatriate footballers in Paraguay